Cheryl Williams may refer to:

Cheryl Williams, footballer with London Bees
Cheryl Williams (Evil Dead), fictional character in Evil Dead